Norman Whittaker Hardy (3 June 1907 – 2 June 1980) was an English first-class cricketer.

Hardy, who was born at Wakefield in June 1907, made a single appearance in first-class cricket for H. D. G. Leveson-Gower's XI against Cambridge University at Eastbourne in 1926. Batting twice in the match, he was dismissed for 6 runs in their first-innings by Edward Cawston, while in their second-innings he finished not out on 8. Opening the bowling in the Cambridge first-innings, he took the wicket of Denys Wilcox to finish with innings figures of 1 for 43, while in their second-innings he dismissed Wilcox, Ken Farnes and Joseph Comber, to finish with innings figures of 3 for 48. He died at sea on board the cruise ship  in June 1980, a day shy of his 73rd birthday.

References

External links

1907 births
1980 deaths
Cricketers from Wakefield
English cricketers
H. D. G. Leveson Gower's XI cricketers
People who died at sea